Rev. J. Edward Nash Sr. House is a historic home located at Buffalo in Erie County, New York. The house was constructed in 1892 and is in the Queen Anne style. It was home to Rev. J. Edward Nash Sr. (1868–1957), a prominent leader in Buffalo's African American community.  He served as pastor at the Michigan Avenue Baptist Church from 1892 to 1953.  Rev. Nash purchased the frame, two flat home in 1925 and his wife remained in the home until 1987.  The house underwent exterior restoration in 2002-2003 and has been designated the Nash House Museum.

It was listed on the National Register of Historic Places in 2007.

References

External links
Celebrate African American History Month 2005--A National Register of Historic Places Feature
Nash, Rev. J. Edward Sr. House – U.S. National Register of Historic Places on Waymarking.com
J. Edward Nash History website
History - Nash House Museum website

Houses on the National Register of Historic Places in New York (state)
Queen Anne architecture in New York (state)
African-American history of New York (state)
Historic house museums in New York (state)
Biographical museums in New York (state)
Museums in Buffalo, New York
Houses in Buffalo, New York
African-American museums in New York (state)
National Register of Historic Places in Buffalo, New York